Sweetland Farmhouse is a historic farmhouse located at Cazenovia in Madison County, New York.  It was built about 1825 and is a -story, rectangular, frame residence with a gable roof and in the Federal style.  Also on the property is a garage, shed, and chicken house.

It was added to the National Register of Historic Places in 1987.

References

Houses on the National Register of Historic Places in New York (state)
Federal architecture in New York (state)
Houses completed in 1825
Houses in Madison County, New York
National Register of Historic Places in Cazenovia, New York